Abdul Aziz Karim Dad (born 20 December 1979 in Umm Sa'id) is a Qatari footballer, who currently plays for Al Kharaitiyat SC.

Career
The midfielder joined in summer 2009 from Al-Arabi to league rival Umm Salal Sport Club. In July 2012, Karim moved to Al-Kharaitiyat from relegated Al-Ahly Doha.

Karim played for Qatar at the 1995 FIFA U-17 World Championship in Ecuador. He won from 2001 to 2007 ten caps for the Qatar national football team.

References

1979 births
Living people
Qatari footballers
Qatar international footballers
2004 AFC Asian Cup players
Al-Arabi SC (Qatar) players
Al Ahli SC (Doha) players
Al Kharaitiyat SC players
Umm Salal SC players
Qatar Stars League players
Footballers at the 1998 Asian Games
Association football midfielders
Asian Games competitors for Qatar